A consolidation bill is a bill introduced into the Parliament of the United Kingdom with the intention of consolidating several Acts of Parliament or Statutory Instruments into a single Act. Such bills simplify the statute book without significantly changing the state of the law, and are subject to an expedited Parliamentary procedure.

The parliamentary practice of legislating only for small portions of a subject at a time can create undue complexity in statute law. Acts relating to a particular subject often end up scattered over many years, and through the operation of clauses partially repealing or amending former acts, the specific meaning of the law regarding the subject  becomes enveloped in intricate or contradictory expressions. For clarity, the law as expressed across many statutes is sometimes recast in a single statute, called a consolidation bill.

By 1911, such bills had been passed dealing with subjects as diverse as customs, stamps and stamp duties, public health, weights and measures, sheriffs, coroners, county courts, housing, municipal corporations, libraries, trustees, copyhold, diseases of animals, merchant shipping, and friendly societies.

These observations apply to the  Public General Acts of the legislature. On the other hand, in settling private Acts, such as those relating to railway and canal enterprise, the legislature always inserted certain clauses founded on reasons of public policy applicable to the business in question. To avoid the necessity of constantly re-enacting the same principles in private Acts, their common clauses were embodied in separate statutes, and their provisions are ordered to be incorporated in any private Act of the description mentioned therein. Such are the Lands Clauses Acts, the Companies Clauses Acts and the Railways Clauses Acts.

Procedure
Consolidation bills are introduced in the House of Lords which, by convention, has primacy in these matters. The Lords has the only substantive discussion on the bill, at its second reading, before the bill is sent to the Joint Committee on Consolidation Bills, which may propose amendments to it. Subject to this, the Lords' third reading and all readings in the House of Commons are usually formalities and pass without debate.

Most consolidation bills are proposed in the first instance by the Law Commission, and it is this prior consideration that gives rise to the expedited process afforded to these bills. Every consolidation bill proposed by the Law Commission has been passed by Parliament.

Once a consolidation bill receives royal assent it becomes a consolidation Act. An example of a consolidation Act is the Powers of Criminal Courts (Sentencing) Act 2000, which consolidated into a single Act parts of sentencing legislation previously spread across twelve separate Acts.

Categories of consolidation bills
There are five categories of bill that qualify as consolidation bills:
Bills which only re-enact existing law.
Bills which consolidate previous laws with amendments, proposed in response to recommendations from the Law Commission.
Bills to repeal existing legislation, again prepared by the Law Commission.
Bills to repeal various obsolete or unnecessary parts of existing legislation.
Bills which make corrections and minor improvements to existing legislation, prepared under the Consolidation of Enactments (Procedure) Act 1949.

The first three categories now account for almost all consolidation bills.

List of Consolidation Acts

No consolidation Acts were passed in 2008.

The following are consolidation Acts:
The Wireless Telegraphy Act 2006 (c 36)
The Parliamentary Costs Act 2006 (c 37)
The National Health Service Act 2006 (c 41)
The National Health Service (Wales) Act 2006 (c 42)
The National Health Service (Consequential Provisions) Act 2006 (c 43)
The Companies Act 2006 (c 46)

No consolidation Acts were passed in 2004.

The European Parliamentary Elections Act 2002 is a consolidation Act.

The Powers of Criminal Courts (Sentencing) Act 2000 (c 6) is a consolidation Act.

No consolidation Acts were passed in 1999.

The Petroleum Act 1998 (c 17) and the Audit Commission Act 1998 (c 18) are consolidation Acts.

The following are consolidation Acts:
The Town and Country Planning (Scotland) Act 1997 (c  8)
The Planning (Listed Buildings and Conservation Areas) (Scotland) Act 1997 (c 9)
The Planning (Hazardous Substances) (Scotland) Act 1997 (c 10)
The Planning (Consequential Provisions) (Scotland) Act 1997 (c 11)
The Architects Act 1997 (c 22)
The Lieutenancies Act 1997 (c 23)
The Nurses, Midwives and Health Visitors Act 1997 (c 24)
The Justices of the Peace Act 1997 (c 25)

The following are consolidation Acts:
The Police Act 1996 (c 16)
The Industrial Tribunals Act 1996 (c 17), which may now be cited as the Employment Tribunals Act 1996 
The Employment Rights Act 1996 (c 18)
The Education Act 1996 (c 56)
The School Inspections Act 1996 (c 57)
The Deer (Scotland) Act 1996 (c 58)

The following are consolidation Acts:
The Merchant Shipping Act 1995 (c 21)
The Shipping and Trading Interests (Protection) Act 1995 (c 22)
The Good Vehicles (Licensing of Operators) 1995 (c 23)
The Criminal Law (Consolidation) (Scotland) Act 1995 (c 39)
The Proceeds of Crime (Scotland) Act 1995 (c 43)
The Criminal Procedure (Scotland) Act 1995 (c 46)

The following are consolidation Acts:
The Vehicle Excise and Registration Act 1994 (c 22)
The Value Added Tax Act 1994 (c 23)
The Drug Trafficking Act 1994 (c 37)

The following are consolidation Acts:
The Charities Act 1993 (c 10)
The Clean Air Act 1993 (c 11)
The Radioactive Substances Act 1993 (c 12)
The Crofters (Scotland) Act 1993 (c 44)
The Scottish Land Court Act 1993 (c 45)
The Health Service Commissioners Act 1993 (c 46)
The Probation Service Act 1993 (c 47)
The Pension Schemes Act 1993 (c 48)
The Pension Schemes (Northern Ireland) Act 1993 (c 49)

The following are consolidation Acts:
The Social Security Contributions and Benefits Act 1992 (c 4)
The Social Security Administration Act 1992 (c 5)
The Social Security (Consequential Provisions) Act 1992 (c 6)
The Social Security Contributions and Benefits (Northern Ireland) Act 1992 (c 7)
The Social Security Administration (Northern Ireland) Act 1992 (c 8)
The Social Security (Consequential Provisions) (Northern Ireland) Act 1992 (c 9)
The Taxation of Chargeable Gains Act 1992 (c 12)
The Protection of Badgers Act 1992 (c 51)
The Trade Union and Labour Relations (Consolidation) Act 1992 (c 52)
The Tribunals and Inquiries Act 1992 (c 53)

The following are consolidation Acts:
The Deer Act 1991 (c 54)
The Agricultural Holdings (Scotland) Act 1991 (c 55)
The Water Industry Act 1991 (c 56)
The Water Resources Act 1991 (c 57)
The Statutory Water Companies Act 1991 (c 58)
The Land Drainage Act 1991 (c 59)

The following are consolidation Acts:
The Capital Allowances Act 1990 (c 1)
The Town and Country Planning Act 1990 (c 8)
The Planning (Listed Buildings and Conservation Areas) Act 1990 (c 9)
The Planning (Hazardous Substances) Act 1990 (c 10)

The following Acts are consolidation Acts:
The Extradition Act 1989 (c 33)
The Opticians Act 1989 (c 44)
The Prisons (Scotland) Act 1989 (c 45)

The following are consolidation Acts:
The Income and Corporation Taxes Act 1988 (c 1)
The Coroners Act 1988 (c 13)
The Court of Session Act 1988 (c 36)
The Road Traffic Act 1988 (c 52)
The Road Traffic Offenders Act 1988 (c 53)
The Road Traffic (Consequential Provisions) Act 1988 (c 54)

The Housing (Scotland) Act 1987 (c 26) is a consolidation Act.

The following are consolidation Acts:
The Agricultural Holdings Act 1986 (c 5)
The Insolvency Act 1986 (c 45)
The Company Directors Disqualification Act 1986 (c 46)
The Parliamentary Constituencies Act 1986 (c 56)

The following are consolidation Acts:
The Companies Act 1985 (c 6)
The Business Names Act 1985 (c 7)
The Company Securities (Insider Dealing) Act 1985 (c 8)
The Companies Consolidation (Consequential Provisions) Act 1985 (c 9)
The Cinemas Act 1985 (c 13)
The Reserve Forces (Safeguard of Employment) Act 1985 (c 17)
The Housing Act 1985 (c 68)
The Housing Associations Act 1985 (c 69)
The Landlord and Tenant Act 1985 (c 70)
The Housing (Consequential Provisions) Act 1985 (c 71)
The Weights and Measures Act 1985 (c 72)

The following are consolidation Acts:
The Public Health (Control of Disease) Act 1984 (c 22)
The Registered Homes Act 1984 (c 23)
The Dentists Act 1984 (c 24)
The Road Traffic Regulation Act 1984 (c 27)
The County Courts Act 1984 (c 28)
The Food Act 1984 (c 30)
The Mental Health (Scotland) Act 1984 (c 36)
The Capital Transfer Tax Act 1984 (c 51)
The Building Act 1984 (c 55)
The Foster Children (Scotland) Act 1984 (c 56)
The Rent (Scotland) Act 1984 (c 58)

The following are consolidation Acts:
The Representation of the People Act 1983 (c 2)
The Matrimonial Homes Act 1983 (c 19)
The Mental Health Act 1983 (c 20)
The Pilotage Act 1983 (c 21)
The Litter Act 1983 (c 35)
The Car Tax Act 1983 (c 53)
The Medical Act 1983 (c 54)
The Value Added Tax Act 1983 (c 55)

The Pastoral Measure 1983 (No 1) is a consolidation Measure.

The following are consolidation Acts:
The Agricultural Training Board Act 1982 (c 9)
The Industrial Training Act 1982 (c 10)
The Civil Aviation Act 1982 (c 16)
The Iron and Steel Act 1982 (c 25)
The Aviation Security Act 1982 (c 36)
The Insurance Companies Act 1982 (c 50)
The Industrial Development Act 1982 (c 52)

The following are consolidation Acts:
The English Industrial Estates Corporation Act 1981 (c 13)
The Public Passenger Vehicles Act 1981 (c 14)
The National Film Finance Corporation Act 1981 (c 15)
The Film Levy Finance Act 1981 (c 16)
The Judicial Pensions Act 1981 (c 20)
The Animal Health Act 1981 (c 22)
The Betting and Gaming Duties Act 1981 (c 63)
The New Towns Act 1981 (c 64)
The Trustee Savings Banks Act 1981 (c 65)
The Compulsory Purchase (Vesting Declarations) Act 1981 (c 66)
The Acquisition of Land Act 1981 (c 67)
The Broadcasting Act 1981 (c 68)

The following are consolidation Acts:
The Child Care Act 1980 (c 5)
The Foster Children Act 1980 (c 6)
The Residential Homes Act 1980 (c 7)
The Reserve Forces Act 1980 (c 9)
The Slaughter of Animals (Scotland) Act 1980 (c 13)
The Magistrates' Courts Act 1980 (c 43)
The Education (Scotland) Act 1980 (c 44)
The Water (Scotland) Act 1980 (c 45)
The Solicitors (Scotland) Act 1980 (c 46)
The Criminal Appeal (Northern Ireland) Act 1980 (c 47)
The Limitation Act 1980 (c 58)
The Overseas Development and Cooperation Act 1980 (c 63)
The Highways Act 1980 (c 66)

The following are consolidation Acts:
The Customs and Excise Management Act 1979 (c 2)
The Customs and Excise Duties (General Reliefs) Act 1979 (c 3)
The Alcoholic Liquor Duties Act 1979 (c 4)
The Hydrocarbon Oil Duties Act 1979 (c 5)
The Matches and Mechanical Lighters Duties Act 1979 (c 6)
The Tobacco Products Duty Act 1979 (c 7)
The Excise Duties (Surcharges or Rebates) Act 1979 (c 8)
The Electricity (Scotland) Act 1979 (c 11)
The Wages Councils Act 1979 (c 12)
The Agricultural Statistics Act 1979 (c 13)
The Capital Gains Tax Act 1979 (c 14)
The International Monetary Fund Act 1979 (c 29)
The Exchange Equalisation Account Act 1979 (c 30)
The Prosecution of Offences Act 1979 (c 31)
The Sale of Goods Act 1979 (c 54)
The Justices of the Peace Act 1979 (c 55)

The following are consolidation Acts:
The Commonwealth Development Corporation Act 1978 (c 2)
The Refuse Disposal (Amenity) Act 1978 (c 3)
The Northern Ireland (Emergency Provisions) Act 1978 (c 5)
The Export Guarantees and Overseas Investment Act 1978 (c 18)
The Oaths Act 1978 (c 19)
The Adoption (Scotland) Act 1978 (c 28)
The National Health Service (Scotland) Act 1978 (c 29)
The Interpretation Act 1978 (c 30)
The Employment Protection (Consolidation) Act 1978 (c 44)

The following are consolidation Acts:
The Agricultural Holdings (Notices to Quit) Act 1977 (c 12)
The British Airways Board Act 1977 (c 13)
The Rent Act 1977 (c 42)
The Protection from Eviction Act 1977 (c 43)
The National Health Service Act 1977 (c 49)

The following are consolidation Acts:
The Fatal Accidents Act 1976 (c 30)
The Legitimacy Act 1976 (c 31)
The Lotteries and Amusements Act 1976 (c 32)
The Restrictive Practices Court Act 1976 (c 33)
The Restrictive Trade Practices Act 1976 (c 34)
The Police Pensions Act 1976 (c 35)
The Adoption Act 1976 (c 36)
The Resale Prices Act 1976 (c 53)
The Sexual Offences (Scotland) Act 1976 (c 67)
The Land Drainage Act 1976 (c 70)
The Supplementary Benefits Act 1976 (c 71)

The following are consolidation Acts:
The Supply Powers Act 1975 (c 9)
The Social Security Act 1975 (c 14)
The Social Security (Northern Ireland) Act 1975 (c 15)
The Industrial Injuries and Diseases (Old Cases) Act 1975 (c 16)
The Industrial Injuries and Diseases (Northern Ireland Old Cases) Act 1975 (c 17)
The Criminal Procedure (Scotland) Act 1975 (c 21)
The House of Commons Disqualification Act 1975 (c 24)
The Northern Ireland Assembly Disqualification Act 1975 (c 25)
The Ministers of the Crown Act 1975 (c 26)
The Ministerial and other Salaries Act 1975 (c 27)
The Nursing Homes Act 1975 (c 37)
The Export Guarantee Act 1975 (c 38)
The Salmon and Freshwater Fisheries Act 1975 (c 51)
The Iron and Steel Act 1975 (c 64)
The Recess Elections Act 1975 (c 66)
The Airports Authority Act 1975 (c 78)

The following are consolidation Acts:
The Slaughterhouses Act 1974 (c 3)
The Legal Aid Act 1974 (c 4)
The Juries Act 1974 (c 23)
The Friendly Societies Act 1974 (c 46)
The Solicitors Act 1974 (c 47)
The Insurance Companies Act 1974 (c 49)

The following are consolidation Acts:
The Costs in Criminal Cases Act 1973 (c 14)
The Matrimonial Causes Act 1973 (c 18)
The Independent Broadcasting Authority Act 1973 (c 19)
The Powers of Criminal Courts Act 1973 (c 62)

The following are consolidation Acts:
The Local Employment Act 1972 (c 5)
The Summer Time Act 1972 (c 6)
The Road Traffic Act 1972 (c 20)
The Betting and Gaming Duties Act 1972 (c 25)
The Town and Country Planning (Scotland) Act 1972 (c 52)
The Contracts of Employment Act 1972 (c 53)
The Land Charges Act 1972 (c 61)
The National Debt Act 1972 (c 65)

The following are consolidation Acts:
The Guardianship of Minors Act 1971 (c 3)
The Vehicles (Excise) Act 1971 (c 10)
The Hydrocarbon Oil (Customs and Excise) Act 1971 (c 12)
The Coinage Act 1971 (c 24)
The Rent (Scotland) Act 1971 (c 28)
The National Savings Bank Act 1971 (c 29)
The Attachment of Earnings Act 1971 (c 32)
The Prevention of Oil Pollution Act 1971 (c 60)
The Tribunals and Inquiries Act 1971 (c 62)
The Town and Country Planning Act 1971 (c 78)

The following are consolidation Acts:
The Taxes Management Act 1970 (c 9)
The Income and Corporation Taxes Act 1970 (c 10)
The Sea Fish Industry Act 1970 (c 11)

The following are consolidation Acts:
The Customs Duties (Dumping and Subsidies) Act 1969 (c 16)
The Trustee Savings Banks Act 1969 (c 50)
The Late Night Refreshment Houses Act 1969 (c 53)

The following are consolidation Acts:
The Provisional Collection of Taxes Act 1968 (c 2)
The Capital Allowances Act 1968 (c 3)
The New Towns (Scotland) Act 1968 (c 16)
The Criminal Appeal Act 1968 (c 19)
The Courts-Martial (Appeals) Act 1968 (c 20)
The Criminal Appeal (Northern Ireland) Act 1968 (c 21)
The Rent Act 1968 (c 23)
The Export Guarantees Act 1968 (c 26)
The Firearms Act 1968 (c 27)
The Housing (Financial Provisions) (Scotland) Act 1968 (c 31)

The following are consolidation Acts:
The Plant Health Act 1967 (c 8)
The General Rate Act 1967 (c 9)
The Forestry Act 1967 (c 10)
The Teachers' Superannuation Act 1967 (c 12)
The Development of Inventions Act 1967 (c 32)
The Air Corporations Act 1967 (c 33)
The Industrial Injuries and Diseases (Old Cases) Act 1967 (c 34)
The Advertisements (Hire-Purchase) Act 1967 (c 42)
The Legal Aid (Scotland) Act 1967 (c 43)
The Road Traffic Regulation Act 1967 (c 76)
The Police (Scotland) Act 1967 (c 77)
The Sea Fisheries (Shellfish) Act 1967 (c 83)
The Sea Fisheries (Conservation) Act 1967 (c 84)

The following are consolidation Acts:
The Mines (Working Facilities and Support) Act 1966 (c 4)
The Sea Fisheries Regulation Act 1966 (c 38)
The Housing (Scotland) Act 1966 (c 49)

The following are consolidation Acts:
The Industrial and Provident Societies Act 1965 (c 12)
The Dangerous Drugs Act 1965 (c 15)
The National Insurance Act 1965 (c 51)
The National Insurance (Industrial Injuries) Act 1965 (c 52)
The Family Allowances Act 1965 (c 53)
The National Health Service Contributions Act 1965 (c 54)
The Statute Law Revision (Consequential Repeals) Act 1965 (c 55)
The Compulsory Purchase Act 1965 (c 56)
The Nuclear Installations Act 1965 (c 57)
The Ministerial Salaries Consolidation Act 1965 (c 58)
The New Towns Act 1965 (c 59)
The Hire-Purchase Act 1965 (c 66)
The Hire-Purchase (Scotland) Act 1965 (c 67)
The Matrimonial Causes Act 1965 (c 72)

The Television Act 1964 (c 21) and the Licensing Act 1964 (c 26) are consolidation Acts.

See also
Legislation
United Kingdom legislation
Destination Tables
Codification (law)

References

External links
The Joint Committee on Consolidation Bills
The Law Commission
The United Kingdom Parliament

Law of the United Kingdom
Parliament of the United Kingdom
Statutory law